Tasneem Mohammad Shah, SI, TI, was a Pakistani scientist and a prominent mathematician who has made pioneering and instrumental research and contributions to the field of computational fluid dynamics (CFD) at A. Q. Khan Research Laboratories (KRL). Trained as an applied mathematician, his contributions include differential geometry, numerical analysis, information security, CFD-DEM model, hydrodynamics (of explosions), computer science, fluid mechanics, Vacuum Technology and CFD-DEM.

Tasneem Mohammad Shah was a pioneer and senior member of the Kahuta Project, and, along with G.D. Alam and Abdul Qadeer Khan, Tasneem Mohammad Shah have had worked out in the nuclear physics involved in gas centrifuge and the uranium based-device. As of today, he is a full professor and chairman of the Department of Mathematics at the Air University.

Biography

Shah was born in Pakistan and had moved to Islamabad for his studies. He attended the jubilant and newly founded university, the Quaid-i-Azam University where he received his undergraduate degree in mathematics from there. He did his MSc, M. Phil. from Quaid-I-Azam University, followed by his DPhil in mathematics from University of Oxford, United Kingdom. His doctoral thesis were written on "Analysis of Multi-Grid Methods, design, theory and development of Algo.".

Shah came back to Pakistan, after the 1971 Winter War where he joined his alma mater, Quaid-i-Azam University. His early research were mainly focused and emphasised on Fluid and Aerodynamics. In 1972, M. Shah was introduced by Asghar Qadir to Abdus Salam, where Professor Salam had delegated M. Shah to Pakistan Atomic Energy Commission where he had closely collaborated with Riazuddin and Asghar Qadir in the development of the nuclear device. At the end of 1975, A. Qadeer Khan had brought the drawings of the Zippe-type centrifuges, which according to Ghulam Dastagir Alam, were incomplete and the drawings of the centrifuge machine were incorrect. Anwar Ali then contacted Hafeez Qureshi to re-design and work out the solution of the Centrifuge machine. Hafeez Qureshi informed Munir Ahmad Khan (who later consulted with Abdus Salam) about the problem faced by the KRL scientists. Tasneem Mohammad Shah who specialised in Fluid dynamics from Oxford, was named by Abdus Salam for the gas-centrifuge project when Munir Ahmad Khan and Hafeez Qureshi consulted with him. In 1975, Anwar Ali and G.D. Alam had met with Tasneem Shah in Islamabad, and Shah, with the full backing of Abdus Salam, was accompanied by G. D. Alam to a secret project in Kahuta in 1975.

In the following years, Shah had joined Abdul Qadeer Khan's then-known as Engineering Research Laboratories (ERL) from its beginning years. Trained as an applied mathematician, Shah was an instrumental carrying out the experimental and theoretical research at KRL. He was the founder and had served as the first director of the Computational Fluid Dynamics Division at the KRL. In particular, he had developed the expertise techniques in fluid explosions—phenomena which are difficult to model mathematically. M. Shah, a pioneer in fluid dynamics, had used complex integrations, and mathematical methods to develop the sustainable method for the gas centrifuges which he published his work at the KRL.

He gained fame in the research laboratory when Shah had mathematically modelled the fluid system in a Zippe-type centrifuge, and have had improved the technology that was brought by Abdul Qadeer Khan in the mid-1970s. His developed theories and the experimental research led to an improvement in the devices, and KRL had developed the advanced and newer versions of the Zippe-type technology as P-1 and P-2. Shah's principal contribution to the gas-centrifuge program was the rotational dynamics of the 235U by using the complex and difficult applications of Washer and Shell integrations.

Shah was one of the key scientists who had helped develop the inertial and thermal system of the Ghauri missile system series. He had laid down the ground work of the liquid-propellant rocketry system and formulated the various mathematical theories of the rocket science. On 28 May 1998, with numerous other KRL and PAEC weapon scientists, Shah was an eyewitness to the first atomic weapons testing, at Ras Koh Hills near at Chagai Hills. He, along with other scientists, was conferred with high civilian awards in 1998, and in 1999.

After serving in KRL for more than 27 years, Shah had begun providing training and teaching at the KRL to the field of fluid dynamics. He established the Department of Cryptology at NUST whereas he served as its first director. He also established the first IT University in private corporate sector and become the first rector of KASBIT, Karachi. He remained Dean, Faculty of Computer Sciences at Bahria University and established an Integrated Scientific and Industrial Software house for contract research (ISIS).  He is the author of 14 research papers. He is also working for establishment of an HEC project, "National Institute of Vacuum Science and technology".

Awards
 Sitara-i-Imtiaz (1998)
Tamgha-i-Imtiaz (1999)
Chagai Medal (1998)

References

Computational fluid dynamicists
Pakistani mathematicians
Project-706
Academic staff of Quaid-i-Azam University
Pakistani cryptographers
Living people
Recipients of Hilal-i-Imtiaz
Weapons scientists and engineers
Fluid dynamicists
Computer designers
Functional analysts
Quaid-i-Azam University alumni
Alumni of the University of Oxford
Monte Carlo methodologists
People from Islamabad
Recipients of Sitara-i-Imtiaz
Recipients of Tamgha-e-Imtiaz
Supercomputing in Pakistan
Academic staff of the National University of Sciences & Technology
Year of birth missing (living people)
Nuclear weapons scientists and engineers